John Paton VC (23 December 1833 – 1 April 1914) was a Scottish recipient of the Victoria Cross, the highest and most prestigious award for gallantry in the face of the enemy that can be awarded to British and Commonwealth forces.

Details
Paton was 23 years old, and a sergeant in the 93rd Regiment of Foot (later The Argyll and Sutherland Highlanders, British Army during the Indian Mutiny when the following deed took place at the Siege of Lucknow for which he was awarded the VC:
 He was celebrated as "The Hero of Lucknow".

He emigrated to Australia in 1861 becoming a prison governor.
He lived with his family in a cottage (no longer standing) near the corner of Prospect Road and Robert Street at Summer Hill in Sydney's inner western suburbs. He worshipped at St. Andrews Anglican Church on the corner of Henson and Smith Streets, Summer Hill. A magnificent bronze memorial was erected in his memory by his sisters and is located on the wall to the immediate left upon entering the church main entrance. A park located across the street from the church is named in his honour His grave (including family members) is in the Anglican Monumental Area "AAA, number 414" of Rookwood Necropolis, Strathfield, Sydney. This impressive monumental grave was completely refurbished in mid-2013 by the Office of Australian War Graves, whose duty includes maintaining in perpetuity the graves of all VC Heroes buried in Australia.

The medal
His Victoria Cross is displayed at the Argyll and Sutherland Highlanders Museum, Stirling Castle, Scotland.

References

Monuments to Courage (David Harvey, 1999)
The Register of the Victoria Cross (This England, 1997)
Scotland's Forgotten Valour (Graham Ross, 1995)

External links
History of Argyll & Sutherland Highlanders

1833 births
1914 deaths
Military personnel from Stirling
British recipients of the Victoria Cross
Argyll and Sutherland Highlanders soldiers
Indian Rebellion of 1857 recipients of the Victoria Cross
Scottish emigrants to Australia
British Army personnel of the Crimean War
British prison governors
British Army recipients of the Victoria Cross
Burials at Rookwood Cemetery